Wesley Boyle (born 30 March 1979) from Northern Ireland is a football midfielder, who currently works as a coach, having last played for Loughgall F.C. Boyle started his career as an apprentice with Leeds United.

References

Since 1888... The Searchable Premiership and Football League Player Database (subscription required)

1979 births
Living people
Doncaster Rovers F.C. players
Association football midfielders
NIFL Premiership players
Leeds United F.C. players
Association footballers from Northern Ireland
Expatriate footballers in England
People from Portadown
Portadown F.C. players
Premier League players
Loughgall F.C. players